The Lima Lees were a minor league professional baseball team that played in the Ohio–Pennsylvania League and Interstate Association. In 1905, the club was managed by Eddie Bailey; in 1906, Harry Truby led the team. Bob Bescher is one known major leaguer to spend time with the club. It was the first pro baseball team to be based in Lima, Ohio since 1895.

References

Defunct minor league baseball teams
Baseball teams established in 1905
1905 establishments in Ohio
Defunct baseball teams in Ohio
Baseball teams disestablished in 1905
Ohio-Pennsylvania League teams